Ganesuni Vari Palem is a village in Chilakaluripet municipality, Edlapadu Mandal, Guntur district,  Andhra Pradesh, India.

References

Villages in Guntur district